Eocypselus vincenti is an extinct species of prehistoric bird believed to be the ancestors of modern hummingbirds and swifts within the family Eocypselidae. It is known from the Fur Formation in the early Eocene of Denmark. It was described from a wing and pectoral bone from an individual found in the London Clay formation. The genus Eocypselus is thought to represent the earliest divergence between Apodiformes in hummingbirds and swifts.

References 

Fossil taxa described in 1984
Birds described in 1984
Prehistoric birds of Europe
Fossils of Denmark
Eocene birds of Europe
Apodiformes